Verticordia venusta is a flowering plant in the myrtle family, Myrtaceae and is endemic to the south-west of Western Australia. It is an openly branched shrub with small, egg-shaped leaves and spikes of pink to maroon-coloured flowers in spring and early summer.

Description
The flowers open in succession, the lowest first, and are pale mauve or pink to maroon, fading as they age. Flowering time is from September to January.

Taxonomy and naming
Verticordia venusta was first formally described by Alex George in 1991 from specimens collected south of Manmanning and the description was published in Nuytsia. The specific epithet (venusta) is a Latin word meaning "like Venus", "beautiful" or "lovely", referring to the plant when in flower.

George placed this species in subgenus Chrysoma, section Chrysoma along with V. citrella, V. endlicheriana and V. acerosa.

Distribution and habitat
This verticordia occurs north-east of Perth between Mullewa, Gunyidi, Dowerin and Bencubbin in the Avon Wheatbelt and Geraldton Sandplains biogeographic regions. It grows in sand, sometimes with gravel or clay in heath and shrubland.

Conservation
Verticordia venusta is classified as "Priority Three" by the Western Australian Government Department of Parks and Wildlife, meaning that it is poorly known and known from only a few locations but is not under imminent threat.

Use in horticulture
Propagation of V. venusta from cuttings has proven difficult but it has been successfully grafted onto Chamelaucium uncinatum rootstock. It is usually slow to establish in the garden but is often hardy and has sometimes been grown in containers for several years.

References

venusta
Rosids of Western Australia
Eudicots of Western Australia
Plants described in 1991